Dragonna is a Philippine superhero television series broadcast on ABS-CBN, based on the comic book character Dragonna created by Mars Ravelo. Shaina Magdayao plays the titular superheroine with Jake Cuenca as her love interest. The series is about a teenage girl who discovers that she has pyrokinetic abilities and decides to use this newly found ability for a greater good. She releases this ability every time she loses her temper.

Two superheroes meet as the heroine Dragonna bids goodbye in her last fight and the bombastic Flash Bomba begins his adventure.

Synopsis
Tomboyish Olive (Shaina Magdayao) comes from a race of Tagon or Taong Dragon with a blood of a dragon thru her family. Olive will discover that she has the power to create fire. Olive dons her costume: Dragonna. Rona's real name is Olive and acquired her own identity to transform into a female taong dragon. Can Edgar actually carry out his plan without falling in love with the feisty girl but will he fall in love with Rona?

The three firemen namely Narcisso (Bayani Agbayani), Elmo (Long Mejia) and Junior (Arnold Reyes) will discover that water will prevent Rona's "hot" temper because of the argument that Rona and Edgar (Jake Cuenca) got into. Olive/Rona turned into a superheroine called; "Dragonna", to meet up with her brother Rafael.

Cast and characters

Main cast
Shaina Magdayao as Olive / Rona / Dragonna - a pretty teenager who has the power to create fire.
Mika dela Cruz as young Rona
Alessandra De Rossi as Alice - Edgar’s mean girlfriend who harbors a deep jealousy over Rona.
Patricia Gayod as young Alice
Jake Cuenca as Edgar - a star basketball player who will capture the heart of Rona.
Francis Magundayao as young Edgar

Supporting cast
Carlos Agassi as Rafael - a thief whose dark identity holds the key to Rona’s past.
Carlo Lacana as young Rafael
Eda Nolan as Ella - Rona’s bubbly and supportive best friend.
Alexa Ilacad as young Ella
Bayani Agbayani as Narcisso a.k.a. Tatay Ngit - the strictest among the three firemen foster fathers of Rona.
Long Mejia as Elmo a.k.a. Tatay Hiks - a fireman and foster father of Rona who is sick with asthma.
Arnold Reyes as Junior a.k.a. Tatay Naks - the most lenient among of Rona’s three foster fathers.

Special participation
Jodi Sta. Maria as Theresa - Mother of Olive turned into a female dragon
Neil Ryan Sese as Arthur -Olive's Father
Cacai Bautista as Ling
Lovely Rivero as Ingrid
Dominic Ochoa as  Bugoy
Joross Gamboa as Migo

See also
Isang Lakas
List of Komiks episodes

References

External links

Dragonna International Hero
Tiny Tony/Drgonna crossover Saturday
Dragonna
Shaina Magdayao fires up TV with "Dragonna" pep.ph

2008 Philippine television series debuts
2009 Philippine television series endings
ABS-CBN drama series
Fantaserye and telefantasya
Filipino-language television shows
Television shows based on comics
Television series by Dreamscape Entertainment Television